Alexander Kazbegi (1848–1893) was a Georgian writer, famous for his 1883 novel The Patricide.

Early life 
Kazbegi was born in Stepantsminda the great grandson of Kazibek Chopikashvili, a local feudal magnate who was in charge of collecting tolls on the Georgian Military Highway. Alexander Kazbegi studied in Tbilisi, Saint Petersburg and Moscow, but on returning home, decided to become a shepherd to experience the lives of the local people. He later worked as a journalist, and then became a novelist and playwright. In his later life, he suffered from insanity. After his death in Tbilisi, his coffin was carried across the Jvari Pass to his hometown of Kazbegi (now renamed Stepantsminda), which also preserves his childhood home as a museum in his honor.

His most famous work, the novel The Patricide is about a heroic Caucasian bandit named Koba, who, much like Robin Hood, is a defender of the poor. Koba has nothing but contempt for authority, a proclivity towards violence, and a firm belief in vengeance. Kazbegi's work was a major inspiration to Iosif Jughashvili, later known as Joseph Stalin, who used Koba as a revolutionary pseudonym.

Museum 
World Bank is supporting restoration of Alexander Kazbegi Museum.

References

 The Prose of the Mountains: Tales of the Caucasus, translated by Rebecca Ruth Gould (Budapest: Central European University Press, CEUP Classics series, 2015). 
 Bullock, Allen. Hitler and Stalin:Parallel Lives. Vintage Books. 1993. 
 Rebecca Ruth Gould, “Aleksandre Qazbegi’s Mountaineer Prosaics: The Anticolonial Vernacular on Georgian-Chechen Borderlands,” Ab Imperio: Studies of New Imperial History in the Post-Soviet Space 15.1 (2014): 361-390.
 Rosen, Roger. Georgia: A Sovereign Country of the Caucasus. Odyssey Publications: Hong Kong, 1999. 

1848 births
1893 deaths
Novelists from Georgia (country)
Male writers from Georgia (country)
Male novelists
19th-century novelists
People from Mtskheta-Mtianeti
19th-century male writers